The YSR Telangana Party, abbreviated as YSRTP, is an Indian regional political party based in the Indian state of Telangana. It was founded on 8 July 2021 by Y. S. Sharmila daughter of former Andhra Pradesh chief minister Y. S. Rajasekhara Reddy.

References

 Political parties in Telangana